Nemours Children's Hospital, Delaware is a pediatric hospital located in Wilmington, Delaware. It is controlled by the Nemours Foundation, a non-profit organization created by philanthropist Alfred I. du Pont in 1936 and dedicated to improving the health of children. Historically, it was referred to as the A. I. duPont Institute for Crippled Children or more simply, the DuPont Institute and provides pediatric specialties and subspecialties to infants, children, teens, and young adults up to age 21.

History

With the words, “It has been my firm conviction throughout life that it is the duty of everyone in the world to do what is within his power to alleviate human suffering,” Alfred I. du Pont bestowed an estate valued at $40 million for the creation of a charitable corporation devoted primarily to providing health care services to children. The resulting Nemours Foundation was charged with the preservation and public enjoyment of the Nemours Estate in Wilmington, the care and treatment of disabled children and the care of low-income seniors throughout the state of Delaware. Nemours has grown to be one of the nation's largest children's health systems, caring for more than a quarter of a million children each year. The hospital is part of the DuPont legacy.

Through his last will and testament, Alfred I. DuPont established a trust composed of his holdings in E. I. du Pont de Nemours and Company which provided for the formation of The Nemours Foundation, named for the duPont family's home in France. The Nemours Foundation was incorporated in Florida in 1936. In 1940, the original Alfred I. duPont Institute was opened in Wilmington, and it quickly became world-renowned for its clinical and research excellence in the field of pediatric orthopedics. It wasn't until 1976 that the Nemours Board of Directors expanded the institute's mission to encompass more pediatric diseases. The first phase of the new Nemours Children's Hospital, Delaware was completed in 1979. Outpatient and ambulatory care was provided at the adjacent Nemours Children's Clinic. The current hospital was completed in 1984. It was named one of the nation's best children's hospitals by Parents Magazine in 2009.
The institute is academically affiliated with both the University of Delaware in Newark and Thomas Jefferson University in Philadelphia, and the residency program is handled through Thomas Jefferson University Hospital.

The Nemours Foundation is the sole beneficiary of the A.I. duPont Testamentary Trust which was valued at $3.4 billion in 2009.  The trusts supporting the Nemours Foundation (the A.I. duPont Testamentary Trust and the Edward Ball Trust) were valued at a combined $5.5 billion in 2015.

On May 12, 2021, the hospital announced that its name will be changed to "Nemours Children’s Hospital, Delaware", in the summer of 2021.

Facilities

The medical campus is located directly east of the DuPont Experimental Station and the site also houses the Nemours Estate . The facility provides Delaware's only Pediatric Trauma Center, advanced inpatient and outpatient pediatric care in more than 30 specialties, intensive and acute pediatric care, as well as pediatric research. The Ronald McDonald House of Delaware located adjacent to the hospital provides sleep rooms and showers for the parents and families of children receiving treatment.

Nemours Biomedical Research occupies the E400 building in the DuPont Experimental Station. 

In 2011, the Nemours Foundation announced a $212 million expansion that would increase the size of the Emergency Department and number of inpatient beds. The construction was completed in 2014 and the doors opened to patients in October 2014.

Specialties
The hospital offers intensive and acute inpatient and outpatient services in more than 30 disciplines. It is internationally recognized in blood and bone marrow transplantation, acondroplasia, cancer, cardiology and cardiac surgery, neurosurgery, orthopedics, and solid organ transplantation.

References

Hospital buildings completed in 1979
Children's hospitals in the United States
Hospitals in Delaware
Alfred I. du Pont
Pediatric trauma centers